Federal Airport Authority of Nigeria (FAAN) is a service organization statutorily charged to manage all Commercial Airports in Nigeria and provide service to both passenger and cargo airlines. Generally, to create conditions for the development in the most economic and efficient manner of air transport and the services connected with it. The agency has its head office on the grounds of Murtala Muhammed International Airport in Ikeja, Lagos State.

History
Civil Aviation in Nigeria is a spin-off of the British Colonial rule. But above all else, it is a product of a mere accident of history dating back to 1925 in the unlikeliest of places - the ancient, walled city of Kano.

Sometime in July of that year the Northern city was gripped by a tense stand-off between the residents and the colonial government officials.

The British government at the time was maintaining an active Royal Air Force (RAF) base in Khartoum, Sudan. On sensing the trouble in Kano, London swiftly signalled the commanding officer of the Khartoum RAF Squadron, instructing him to fly to the Northern Nigerian city and report on the situation. Flying a Bristol fighter, the pilot made a breath- taking but safe landing on the horse race course in Kano, thus going down in history as the first recorded aviation activity in Nigeria.

Without air routes, maps or radio communications the flight was regarded as "a particularly hazardous operation". So alarmed were officials that an idea was mooted that if Khartoum-Kano was ever to be made an air routes it would be necessary to have emergency landing grounds every 20 miles of the way.

Subsequent flights were to be originated from Cairo, Egypt where the RAF also had a base. The landings were so spectacular that one Kano resident was moved to paint the scene (the water colour picture was later acquired by the government). The RAF operations were later to become an annual event, with frequency and route extended to cover Maiduguri.

The earliest known commercial aviation activity in Nigeria is credited to one gentle man, "Bud" Carpenter, who owned the earliest type of the Light aircraft, de Havilland Moth. Records show that he frequently undertook high-risk flights between Kano and Lagos, using the rail tracks as his guide and piling up extra distance in the process.

In the early 1930s, an enterprising pilot carried a few fare-paying passengers in a seaplane between Lagos and Warri. With the continuation of the annual RPLF flights, aviation activities in Nigeria became quite considerable, creating the need for aerodromes.

Consequently, a representative of the Air Ministry in London visited Nigeria to inspect what could then be appropriately described as "landing grounds". Sites were selected at Maiduguri, Oshogbo, Lagos, Minna, Kano and Kaduna.

Wing Commander E. H. Coleman, one of the earliest observers of the evolution of civil aviation in Nigeria described the aerodromes thus:

It must be remembered, however that what was called an aerodrome in those days would by no means meet requirements for even some of the small aeroplanes of' modern times. In the early days it was considered necessary to construct several runways oriented in varying directions to avoid cross wind landings and take-offs, as the older type of tail wheel aircraft was more prone to swing than the modern nose wheel types.

In 1935, the operations of the RAF were replaced by those of the Imperial Airways that flew regular airmail and passengers from London to Nigeria. These services thus pioneered commercial international operations in Nigeria, although it was not until 1936 that commercial aviation actually came to Nigeria. The Imperial Airways, the forerunner of the British Overseas Airways Corporation (BOAC), operated large four-engined aeroplanes, known as the Hannibal class or the Handley, on the Nile route from Cairo to Kisumu, Uganda. Towards the end of 1936, a once-weekly service was introduced and another route, Khartoum–Kano–Lagos, flight, which took seven days, was operated with a relatively small four-engined aircraft De Havilland 86 (one of the DH 86's well-known passengers was Sir Bernard Bourdillon, who flew on the first ever commercial flight from Lagos).

In Nigeria early Pilots were brave and had to weather the harsh harmattan and rainy conditions. But there was one peculiar emergency landing near Maiduguri in 1937. Engineers were promptly despatched from Kano. They arrived a day later on horseback with their tool kits. After some repairs the aircraft was flown out and again placed in service: Records show that it usually took a whole day to fly from Kano to Lagos in a DH8, considering its early technology and en route refuelling stops.

WAAC was charged to "Develop air services in and between West African territories". The airline began services with a six-seater De Havilland Dove aircraft. Its Nigerian domestic services were operated with the Dove while the West Coast services were operated with Bristol Wayfarers. The control and administration of Civil Aviation were vested in the Directorates of Public Works of these countries who applied United Kingdom Colonial Air Navigator orders as their legislative authority.

On attaining independence in 1957 Ghana pulled out of the airline company, and in August 1958 the Nigerian government in partnership with BOAC and Elder Dempster lines formed the West African Airways Corporation (Nigeria) limited (which would later metamophorse into today's Nigeria Airways). This single, historic move heralded the genesis of the airline industry in Nigeria.

Maintenance
When dealing with the complete range of complex systems in use for safety of air traffic services in the environment, every minute detail is taken into account in planning for maintenance infrastructures and logistic support. The following are maintenance infrastructure and logistic support services necessary for efficient maintenance services that FAAN provides:

 External/internal equipment monitoring devices
 Central maintenance workshop/laboratory
 Other logistic support systems

External/Internal Equipment Monitoring Devices
Currently, Federal Airports Authority of Nigeria equipment/facility status and failure information are received through service operator/users reports and many other types of diverse monitoring devices However, with the determination of the Authority to improve services, more elaborate monitoring devices aimed at immediate detection of equipment/facility failures are now envisaged to cope with the increasing sophistication of various systems. The device with visual display in the equipment room will indicate the configuration of all associated equipment in real time

Research
This is a special dedicated workshop/laboratory where specific system maintenance is carried out to component-level. The maintenance, repairs, modification etc., of all analogue units are carried out with conventional measuring apparatus such as traditional multi-meters, generators, oscilloscopes, etc. The performance of these test instruments is checked and re-calibration is carried out every two years.

Logistics
The procurement, proper storage and easy retrieval of spare parts are a primary responsibility of the stores unit of the Federal Airports Authority of Nigeria. In view of the very large volume of spare parts stocked for every system, there are plans to computerize this sector in order to enhance performance. Other vital factors affecting FAAN's maintenance capabilities include the efficiency of public utilities like the National Electric Power Authority, NEPA (public power supply), The Nigerian Telecommunication (NITEL) and the various water boards.

Operations

Airports
Owned and operated by FAAN:
 Nnamdi Azikiwe International Airport
 Mallam Aminu Kano International Airport
 Murtala Muhammed International Airport
 Port Harcourt International Airport
 Kaduna Airport
 Maiduguri International Airport
 Yakubu Gowon Airport
 Yola Airport
 Sadiq Abubakar III International Airport
 Margaret Ekpo International Airport
 Akanu Ibiam International Airport
 Sam Mbakwe International Cargo Airport
Ibadan Airport
Ilorin Airport

References

External links

 FAAN Official website
FAAN Carrier Portal

Airports in Lagos
Organizations based in Lagos